Daigaku (大学 or 大學) is the Japanese word for "college" or "university". See a list of universities in Japan for specific universities.

It may also refer to:
Daigaku (大学), the Japanese title of Great Learning, one of the "Four Books" in Confucianism
Daigaku Honyaku Center (est. 1972), a Japanese manufacturer of cosmetics and health food supplements in Tokyo, Japan
Daigaku Horiguchi (堀口大學, 1892-1981), a poet and translator of French literature in Taishō and Shōwa period Japan
Daigaku Munemasa (大岳 宗正, born 1965), sumo wrestler
Daigaku Megusuri (大学目薬), the former name of Santen Pharmaceutical, a Japanese pharmaceutical company
Daigaku wa Detakeredo... (大学は出たけれど), the Japanese title of I Graduated, But..., a 1929 Japanese silent film directed by Yasujirō Ozu
Daigaku-no-kami, a Japanese Imperial court position and the title of the chief education expert in the rigid court hierarchy
Daigaku-ryō, the former Imperial university of Japan, founded at the end of the 7th century
Onna Daigaku, an 18th-century Japanese educational text

See also
Daigaku Station (disambiguation)
Imperial Universities
Daigakkō